Mauricio Ernesto Pereyra Antonini (born 15 March 1990) is a Uruguayan professional footballer who plays as an attacking midfielder for Major League Soccer club Orlando City.

Career

Club Nacional
Pereyra made his professional debut for Nacional in a 2009 Copa Libertadores qualifying match against Paraguayan Club Nacional, on 18 February 2009.

Lanús
On 2 August 2011, Pereyra joined Lanús of Argentina for a fee of US$1,300,000. On 26 September 2011 he scored his first goal in the 1–1 home draw against Club Atlético Colón.

Krasnodar
On 24 February 2013, Pereyra signed for Krasnodar on a three-and-a-half year contract, extending his contract on 30 April 2015, until the summer of 2019. 

On 20 May 2019, FC Krasnodar confirmed that Pereyra will leave the club after his contract expires at the end of the 2018–19 season.

Orlando City
On 30 July 2019, Orlando City announced they had signed Pereyra, initially to a Designated Player contract. He made his debut for the team on 17 August 2019, appearing as a half-time substitute in a 1–1 draw away to Minnesota United. He scored his first goal for the club on 20 July 2020 in a 1–1 draw against Philadelphia Union during the MLS is Back Tournament. He scored again in the tournament's final on 11 August as Orlando finished runners-up, losing to Portland Timbers 2–1. Ahead of the 2022 season, Pereyra signed a new one-year DP contract with Orlando and was named captain following the offseason departure of Nani. On November 23, 2022, Orlando signed Pereyra to a new two-year contract using allocation money meaning he would no longer occupy a Designated Player slot.

Career statistics

Club

Honours
Nacional
Uruguayan Primera División (2): 2008–09, 2010–11

Orlando City
U.S. Open Cup: 2022

References

External links

RFPL profile (Russian)

1990 births
Living people
Footballers from Montevideo
Uruguayan footballers
Uruguayan expatriate footballers
Uruguay under-20 international footballers
Association football midfielders
Club Atlético Lanús footballers
Club Nacional de Football players
Uruguayan Primera División players
Argentine Primera División players
Expatriate footballers in Argentina
Russian Premier League players
Expatriate footballers in Russia
FC Krasnodar players
Orlando City SC players
Designated Players (MLS)
Major League Soccer players